Les Frères Jacques were a French vocal quartet active from 1946 to 1982, comprising André Bellec, Georges Bellec, François Soubeyran, and Paul Tourenne.

Albums
Mythologie,  Arion 1979

References

French musical groups
Vocal quartets
Musical groups from Paris